The 2019 Atlanta Reign season was the first season of the Atlanta Reign's existence in the Overwatch League as one of eight expansion franchises added for the 2019 season.

The Reign's first ever regular season OWL match resulted in a 4–0 victory against Florida Mayhem on February 15. Atlanta finished Stage 1 with a 4–3 record and secured a spot in the Stage 1 playoffs, but a 1–3 loss in the quarterfinals by the Philadelphia Fusion ended their playoff run. Prior to Stage 2, multiple roster changes took place, including the retirement of Daniel "dafran" Francesca. The Reign struggled throughout Stages 2 and 3, posting a combined 5–9 record and no stage playoff appearances. The team hit their stride in Stage 4, when the league implemented a 2-2-2 role lock. A 4–0 victory over the Boston Uprising on August 25 gave the Reign a perfect 7–0 record in Stage 4, a 16–12 record for the season, and the sixth seed in the season playoffs.

Atlanta's first playoff match resulted with a 4–3 victory over the San Francisco Shock on September 6. However, the team fell 2–4 to the New York Excelsior the following match, sending them to the lower bracket. A 0–4 loss to the Hangzhou Spark in the following match ended the Reign's playoff run.

Preceding offseason 
On September 9, 2018, Atlanta announced the hiring of former San Francisco Shock head coach Brad "Sephy" Rajani as the team's head coach. On October 28, 2018, the Reign announced their full roster, consisting of eight players. It did not include any player that had previously competed in the Overwatch League; instead, the team signed the following players from various Overwatch Contenders scenes:

Jun "Erster" Jeong,
Ilya "NLaaeR" Koppalov,
Daniel "dafran" Francesca,
Blake "Gator" Scott,
Hyeonjun "Pokpo" Park,
Donghyung "Daco" Seo,
Steven "Kodak" Rosenberger, and
Petja "Masaa" Kantanen.

On November 7, initial roster signee Daniel "dafran" Francesa announced via Twitter that he would be leaving the Overwatch League; however, the resignation was short-lived, as just two days later, dafran decided to remain a member of the Atlanta Reign. On February 11, Reign promoted Dusttin "Dogman" Bowerman from ATL Academy.

Regular season 

The Reign's first regular season OWL match was against the Florida Mayhem on February 15; Atlanta swept Florida 4–0. The Reign 3–1 to finished Stage 1 with a 4–3 record and claimed the fifth seed in the Stage 1 playoffs. In the quarterfinals, Atlanta lost to the Philadelphia Fusion, 1–3.

Multiple roster changes occurred prior to the beginning of Stage 2. Five days after Reign's Stage 1 playoff loss, Dafran announced that he was, again, officially retiring from the Overwatch League and became a streamer for the Reign. On March 31, the team announced that British main support player Daniel "FunnyAstro" Hathaway had been signed to the Atlanta Reign and ATL Academy on a two-way contract. Two days later, the team announced that American DPS player Andrej "babybay" Francisty had been transferred to the Reign from the San Francisco Shock. On April 3, Atlanta acquired off-tank player Nathan "frd" Goebel from the Los Angeles Gladiators academy team Gladiators Legion. Atlanta finished Stage 2 with a 3–4 record, giving the team an overall record if 7–7, and did not qualify for the Stage 2 playoffs.

In Stage 3, the Reign headed to the Cobb Energy Performing Arts Centre in Atlanta to host the "Atlanta Reign Homestand Weekend". Their first match at the homestand was against the Toronto Defiant on July 6. Dogman and Babybay put on strong offensive performances in the match, as Atlanta went on to win the match 3–1, giving the team their first win of Stage 3. The next day, Atlanta faced the Florida Mayhem. The Reign closed out Stage 3 on a high note, sweeping the Mayhem 4–0 to post a perfect record in front of their home crowd in Atlanta.

Atlanta claimed a perfect 7–0 record in Stage 4, giving the team a 16–12 record for the season. Additionally, the team's +19 map differential put them just ahead of the London Spitfire, who had the same record, in the regular season standings to give them the sixth seed in the season playoffs.

Homestand Weekend 

Stage 3 saw the "Atlanta Reign Homestand Weekend" – the second of three Overwatch League "Homestand Weekends" of the 2019 season. The two-day event, which took tale place at the Cobb Energy Performing Arts Centre in Atlanta, Georgia on July 6–7, featured four matches per day among eight Overwatch League teams. The Homestand, which saw a sold-out crowd of 2,700 attendees for both days, was smaller than the Dallas Fuel Homestand, as the Allen Event Center in Dallas, Texas. Sponsors for the event included Bud Light and Atlanta-based company Coca-Cola. In reference to the League's plan to hold matches in the 2020 season locally, Activision-Blizzard Esports Leagues President & CEO Pete Vlastelica said, "It's showing us the model can work. If these were just fun events that fans were attending because they love the Overwatch game, it would be less exciting. But what we saw in Dallas (in April) and are seeing here is these are home events. At the Dallas event, when the Dallas team took the stage, the whole crowd of 4,500 people started screaming, 'Let’s go Dallas.' … That gives us a lot of optimism going into next season to see the demand for these events to fill pretty nice sized arenas."

Playoffs 
Atlanta opened the double-elimination season playoffs with a match against the third-seeded San Francisco Shock on September 6. The two teams traded blows throughout the entirety of the match, with Atlanta winning maps one, three, and five, and San Francisco winning maps two, four, and six. For the final map of the series, the Reign sent the match to Rialto, while the Shock opted to attack first. On their attack, the Shock managed to reach the first two checkpoints, but the Reign held them from completing the map as the cart stopped at the choke near the end of the map. On defense, San Francisco yielded the first two checkpoints to Atlanta. With about 30 seconds remaining on their attack and the payload only a few meters away from the Shock's distance pushed, the Reign engaged the Shock at the choke; Atlanta's DPS, and former Shock player, Andrej "babybay" Francisty eliminated San Francisco's main tank Yoo "smurf" Myeong-hwan, who was the only Shock player preventing the payload from advancing. With all of the other Shock players focused on other engagements, none of them were near the payload, and the cart rolled forward far enough for Atlanta to take the map claim a 4–3 victory.

Moving on the first round of the winners' bracket, the Reign next faced the second-seeded New York Excelsior two days later. New York jumped to a quick lead, winning on Busan and King's Row in the first to matches, but Atlanta closed the gap after the match break, claiming a win on Hanamura. For map four, New York selected Rialto, and while the Reign nearly took that map to even the score, excellent defensive Bastion play by New York's Park "Saebyeolbe" Jong-ryeol ensured that the Reign would fall short. The Reign selected Lijiang Tower for map five and won it in two rounds, again closing the gap. However, the Excelsior closed out the series with a win on Numbani. The 2–4 loss sent the Reign to the lower bracket.

Atlanta's next match was against the forth-seeded Hangzhou Spark on September 12 in the second round of the lower bracket. Like their two previous matches, the Spark jumped out to an early 1–0 lead after winning on Busan. For map two, the Reign selected Numbani – a map that the Reign had performed historically well on. After both teams completed the map on their respective attacks, the map went to overtime rounds. With only one minute in the time bank, the Spark rolled on their second attack, completing the map second time; Atlanta failed to complete the same feat and took the map loss. The Spark carried their momentum into the following to maps, winning them both, as the Reign were swept, 4–0, ending their playoff run.

Final roster

Transactions 
Transactions of/for players on the roster during the 2019 regular season:
On March 28, Daniel "dafran" Francesca retired.
On March 29, Reign signed Daniel "FunnyAstro" Hathaway.
On April 2, Reign acquired Andrej "Babybay" Francisty from San Francisco Shock.
On April 3, Reign signed Nathan "frd" Goebel.
On June 10, Reign moved Steven "Kodak" Rosenberger to ATL Academy.

Standings

Record by stage

League

Game log

Regular season

Playoffs

Awards 
On May 8, Dusttin "Dogman" Bowerman was named as a reserve for the 2019 Overwatch League All-Star Game.

References 

2019 Overwatch League seasons by team
Atlanta Reign
Atlanta Reign seasons